Lambertia ericifolia , commonly known as heath-leaved honeysuckle, is a shrub which is endemic to the south-west of Western Australia. It grow up to 5 metres high and has orange to red flowers which appear from spring to autumn.

The species was formally described in 1830 by botanist Robert Brown based on plant material collected by William Baxter near King George Sound.

References

Eudicots of Western Australia
ericifolia
Endemic flora of Southwest Australia